India participated in the 2012 Asian Beach Games in Haiyang, China. India won 2 Gold and 1 Bronze medal and finished at 6th place.

Medalists 

Nations at the 2012 Asian Beach Games
2012
Asian Beach Games